Ive may refer to:

 Ive Ivanov (born 1985), Croatian basketball player
 Ive Jerolimov (born 1958), Croatian football player
 Ive Mažuran (1928–2016), Croatian historian
 Ive Sulentic (born 1959), Canadian soccer player of Croatian descent
 Ive Šubic (1922-–1989), Slovene painter

See also
 Ivo
 Ivan (name)

Croatian masculine given names
Slovene masculine given names